is a novel by the Japanese writer Kōbō Abe, published in 1962. It won the 1962 Yomiuri Prize for literature, and an English translation by E. Dale Sauders, and a film adaptation, directed by Hiroshi Teshigahara, appeared in 1964.

The novel is intended as a commentary on the claustrophobic and limiting nature of existence, as well as a critique of certain aspects of Japanese social behavior. The story is preceded by the aphorism "Without the threat of punishment there is no joy in flight."

Plot
In 1955, Jumpei Niki, a schoolteacher from Tokyo, visits a fishing village to collect insects.  After missing the last bus, he is led by the villagers, in an act of apparent hospitality, to a house in the dunes that can be reached only by rope ladder. The next morning the ladder is gone and he finds he is expected to keep the house clear of sand with the woman living there, with whom he is also to produce children. He ultimately finds a way to collect water which gives him a purpose and a sense of liberty. He also wants to share the knowledge of his technique of water collection with the villagers someday. He eventually gives up trying to escape when he comes to realize that returning to his old life would give him no more liberty. He accepts his new identity and family. After seven years, he is proclaimed officially dead. (In the original Japanese version, he is proclaimed officially as a missing person.)

Publication, reception, and legacy
The book attracted much attention in Japan on its publication in 1962, earning praise from critics as well as contemporaries such as Kenzaburō Ōe and Yukio Mishima.  It won that year's Yomiuri Prize for literature.  An English translation appeared in 1964, as did a film adaptation directed by Hiroshi Teshigahara starring Eiji Okada and Kyōko Kishida which won the Special Jury Prize at the 1964 Cannes Film Festival.

References

Works cited

Further reading

External links
 
 The Woman in the Dunes at the Internet Archive

1962 novels
20th-century Japanese novels
Japanese novels adapted into films
Novels by Kobo Abe